Rigobert Matt (born 10 May 1963) is a German former professional racing cyclist. 

In 1981 Matt won the UCI Cyclo-cross World Championships – Junior men's race. He rode in the 1985 Giro d'Italia where he did not finish after pulling out on stage 18. In the Road race at the 1986 UCI Road World Championships Matt was in the early break he stayed away with Alex Stieda till the seventh lap where they were caught, he eventually pulled out of the race after nine laps.

Major results
Sources:
1981
 1st  UCI Junior Cyclo-cross World Championships
1986
 1st Stage 5b Four Days of Dunkirk

Grand Tour result
Source:

References

External links
 

1963 births
Living people
German male cyclists
Place of birth missing (living people)
People from Waldshut (district)
Sportspeople from Freiburg (region)
Cyclists from Baden-Württemberg